Sector 5 is an administrative unit of Bucharest.

Quarters 

 13 Septembrie
 Cotroceni
 Ferentari
 Ghencea
 Giurgiului
 Odăi
 Rahova

Politics 

From 2020 until May 2022, the mayor of the sector was Cristian Popescu Piedone, a member of the Social Liberal Humanist Party (PUSL) and former mayor of Sector 4. He was elected in 2020 for a four-year term, defeating incumbent Daniel Florea, who had been mayor since 2016. 
In May 2022, vice-mayor Mircea Nicolaidis took over as interim mayor of Sector 5.

The Local Council of Sector 5 has 27 seats, with the following party composition (as of 2020):

References

External links 

Sectors of Bucharest